GOM may refer to:
Konkani language's ISO 639-3 code
Knight Grand Officer Royal Order of Monisaraphon, post-nominal letters
Gomshall railway station's National Rail station code
Good Old Mad or GOM, a reimplementation of the original 7090 MAD programming language
 Group & Organization Management, a peer-reviewed academic journal
Gulf of Mexico, an ocean basin bordering on Mexico, the southern United States and Cuba

People
Leona Gom (born 1946), Canadian novelist and poet
William Ewart Gladstone (nickname from the phrase "Grand Old Man")

See also
Gom jabbar, a fictional device in Frank Herber's Dune universe
GOM Player, a media player for Windows
GOMS, Goals, Operators, Methods, and Selection rules, specialized model for human computer interaction observation
Ousmane N'Gom Camara (born 1975), Guinean football player